Catocala nuptialis, the married underwing, is a moth of the family Erebidae. The species was first described by Francis Walker in 1858. It is found in North America from Manitoba south through Minnesota and Nebraska to eastern Oklahoma and Texas and east to Kentucky and Illinois.

The wingspan is 40–50 mm. Adults are on wing from June to September depending on the location. There is probably one generation per year.

The larvae feed on Amorpha canescens.

References

External links
Oehlke, Bill. "Catocala nuptialis Walker, [1858]". The Catocala Website. Archived May 12, 2008.

nuptialis
Moths described in 1858
Moths of North America